Kültepe (Turkish:  ash-hill), also known as Kanesh  or Nesha, is an archaeological site in Kayseri Province, Turkey, inhabited from the beginning of the 3rd millennium BC, in the Early Bronze Age. The nearest modern city to Kültepe is Kayseri, about 20km southwest. It consisted of an Upper city, and a lower city, where an Assyrian kârum, trading colony, was found. Its ancient names are recorded in Assyrian and Hittite sources. In cuneiform inscriptions from the 20th and the 19th century BC, the city was mentioned as Kaneš (Kanesh); in later Hittite inscriptions, the city was mentioned as Neša (Nesha, Nessa, Nesa), or occasionally as Aniša (Anisha). In 2014, the archaeological site was inscribed in the Tentative list of World Heritage Sites in Turkey. It is the place where the earliest record of a definitively Indo-European language has been found, Hittite, dated to the 20th century BC.

History

Kaneš or Neša, inhabited continuously from the Early Bronze Age, c. 3000–2500 BC (only in the Upper City), to Byzantine times, flourished as an important Hattian, Hittite and Hurrian city, containing a large Assyrian kārum (merchant colony) from  BC. This kārum appears to have served as "the administrative and distribution centre of the entire Assyrian colony network in Anatolia". A late record, from circa 1400 BC, recounts the story of a king of Kaneš called Zipani, with seventeen local city-kings who rose up against Naram-Sin of Akkad, who ruled circa 2254–2218 BC.

During the kārum period, and before the conquest of Pitḫana, these local kings reigned in Kaneš: 
Ḫurmili (before 1790 BC)
Paḫanu (a short time in 1790 BC)
Inar (c. 1790–1775 BC), then
Waršama (c. 1775–1750 BC).

The king of Zalpuwa, Uḫna, raided Kaneš, after which the Zalpuwans carried off the city's Šiuš idol. Pitḫana, the king of Kuššara, conquered Neša "in the night, by force", but "did not do evil to anyone in it". Neša revolted against the rule of Pitḫana's son, Anitta, but Anitta quashed the revolt and made Neša his capital. Anitta further invaded Zalpuwa, captured its king Huzziya, and recovered the Šiuš idol for Neša.

In the 17th century BC, Anitta's descendants moved their capital to Hattusa, which Anitta had cursed, thus founding the line of Hittite kings. The inhabitants thus referred to the Hittite language as Nešili 'the Neša tongue'.

Archaeology 
 
 
 

By 1880, cuneiform tablets said to be from Kara Eyuk ('black village') or Gyul Tepé ('burnt mound') near Kaisariyeh, had begun to appear on the market, some being thus bought by the British Museum. In response the site was worked by Ernest Chantre for two seasons, beginning in 1893.<ref>Ernest Chantre, Recherches archéologiques dans l'Asie occidentale : mission en Cappadoce, 1893-1894, 1898</ref>
Hugo Grothe dug a small soundage in 1906.
In 1925, Bedřich Hrozný excavated Kültepe and found over 1000 cuneiform tablets, some of which ended up in Prague and in Istanbul.Veysel Donbaz, Keilschrifttexte in den Antiken-Museen zu Stambul 2, Freiburger Altorientalische Studien, 1989 In 1929 the site was visited
and photographed by James Henry Breasted of the Oriental Institute of Chicago. There had been much digging for fertilizer, which had destroyed a quarter of the mound.

Modern archaeological work began in 1948, when Kültepe was excavated by a team from the Turkish Historical Society and the General Directorate of Antiquities and Museums. The team was led by Tahsin Özgüç until his death, in 2005.

 Level IV–III.  Little excavation has been done for these levels, which represent the kârum's first habitation. No writing is attested, and archaeologists assume that both levels' inhabitants were illiterate.
 Level II, 1974–1836 BC (Mesopotamian middle chronology according to Veenhof). Craftsmen of this time and place specialised in animal-shaped earthen drinking vessels, which were often used for religious rituals. Assyrian merchants then established the kârum of the city: "Kaneš". Bullae of Naram-Sin of Eshnunna have been found toward the end of this level, which was burned to the ground.
 Level Ib, 1798–1740 BC. After an abandoned period, the city was rebuilt over the ruins of the old and again became a prosperous trade center. The trade was under the control of Ishme-Dagan I, who was put in control of Assur when his father, Shamshi-Adad I, conquered Ekallatum and Assur. However, the colony was again destroyed by fire.
 Level Ia. The city was reinhabited, but the Assyrian colony was no longer inhabited. The culture was early Hittite. Its name in Hittite acquired an extra sound as "Kaneša", which was more commonly contracted to "Neša".

Some attribute Level II's burning to the conquest of the city of Assur by the kings of Eshnunna, but Bryce blames it on the raid of Uhna. Some attribute Level Ib's burning to the fall of Assur, other nearby kings and eventually to Hammurabi of Babylon.

To date, over 20,000 cuneiform tablets have been recovered from the site, mainly from the karum, with only 40 found in the Upper city.K. R. Veenhof, Ankara Kultepe Tabletleri V, Turk Tarih Kurumu, 2010, 

 Kârum Kaneš 
The quarter of the city that most interests historians is the kārum, a portion of the city that was set aside by local officials for the early Assyrian merchants to use without paying taxes as long as the goods remained inside the kārum. The term kārum means "port" in Akkadian, the lingua franca of the time, but its meaning was later extended to refer to any trading colony whether or not it bordered water.

Several other cities in Anatolia also had a kārum, but the largest was Kaneš, whose important kārum was inhabited by soldiers and merchants from Assyria for hundreds of years. They traded local tin and wool for luxury items, foodstuffs, spices and woven fabrics from the Assyrian homeland and Elam.

The remains of the kārum form a large circular mound 500 m in diameter and about 20 m above the plain (a tell). The kārum settlement is the result of several superimposed stratigraphic periods. New buildings were constructed on top of the remains of the earlier periods so there is a deep stratigraphy from prehistoric times to the early Hittite period.

The kārum was destroyed by fire at the end of levels II and Ib. The inhabitants left most of their possessions behind, as found by modern archaeologists.

The findings have included numerous baked-clay tablets, some of which were enclosed in clay envelopes stamped with cylinder seals. The documents record common activities, such as trade between the Assyrian colony and the city-state of Assur and between Assyrian merchants and local people. The trade was run by families rather than the state. The Kültepe texts are the oldest documents from Anatolia. Although they are written in Old Assyrian, the Hittite loanwords and names in the texts are the oldest record of any Indo-European language (see also Ishara). Most of the archaeological evidence is typical of Anatolia rather than of Assyria, but the use of both cuneiform and the dialect is the best indication of Assyrian presence.

 Dating of Waršama Sarayi 
At Level II, the destruction was so total that no wood survived for dendrochronological studies. In 2003, researchers from Cornell University dated wood in level Ib from the rest of the city, built centuries earlier. The dendrochronologists date the bulk of the wood from buildings of the Waršama Sarayi to 1832 BC, with further refurbishments up to 1779 BC.
In 2016 new research using carbondating and dendrology on timber used in this site and the palace in Acemhöyük show the likely earliest use of the palace as not before 1851–1842 BC (68.2% hpd; the 95.4% hpd is 1855–1839 BC). In combination with the many Assyrian objects found here, this dating shows that only middle or low-middle chronology are the only remaining possible chronologies that fit these new data.

See also

Hittite sites
Cities of the ancient Near East
Short chronology timeline
Tahsin Özgüç

References

Sources

 
 
 
 
 
 
 
 
 
 
 
J Mellaart, Anatolian Chronology in the Early and Middle Bronze Age, 1957, Anatolian Studies'', vol.7, pp. 55–88
Tahsin Özgüç, Kültepe, Yapi Kredi, 2005, 
KR Veenhof, Kanesh: an Old Assyrian colony in Anatolia, in Civilizations of the Ancient Near East ed. by J. Sasson, Scribners, 1995

External links

Cuneiform tablet case - Metropolitan Museum of Art

Populated places established in the 3rd millennium BC
1893 archaeological discoveries
Hittite cities
Archaeological sites in Central Anatolia
World Heritage Tentative List for Turkey
Tells (archaeology)
Ancient Assyrian cities
Old Assyrian Empire
Early Ceramics in Anatolia